Robert Alexander Wason (6 April 1874 – 11 May 1955) was an American writer. He was known for writing novels predominantly on a western theme, and short stories, some of them serials.

Wason was born in Toledo, Ohio to Robert Alexander Wason, a merchant, and Gertrude Louise  Paddock. He went to High School in Delphi, Indiana and then clerked for his father for eight years, punctuated by episodes of tramping and camping in the west. Wason served in the U. S. Army (artillery) for nine months during the Spanish–American War (1898–99), and worked in a wide variety of jobs and places before settling down to a career writing, with his westerns incorporating items from his life's experiences. In addition to clerking for his father, he worked as an office boy, a grip man on the San Francisco cable cars, a miner in a Nevada mercury mine, and as a farmer in Delphi, Indiana. Over his life he lived in Ohio, Indiana, San Francisco, Detroit, Orr's Island, Maine, Temple, Arizona, Arden, Delaware, Norwalk, Connecticut, and Mountain Lakes, New Jersey. Wason married Emma Louise Brownell in Peru, Indiana in 1911. They had two sons and a daughter. He died in Mountain Lakes, New Jersey.

Works 
Babe Randolph's Turning Point (1904) 
The Wolves (1908) 
 Nachette (1909) (with Ned Nye)
Happy Hawkins (1909) 
The Steering Wheel (1910)
The Knight Errant (1911)
The Dog and the Child and the Ancient Sailor Man (1911)
Friar Tuck (1912)
And Then Came Jean (1913)
Happy Hawkins in the Panhandle (1914)
Correspondence with H. L. Mencken (1916)
Happy Hawkins again (1925)

References

External links 
 
 
 

1874 births
1955 deaths
20th-century American novelists
American male novelists
Western (genre) writers
Writers from Toledo, Ohio
People from Delphi, Indiana
20th-century American male writers
Novelists from Ohio